Michel Shehadeh born in 1956, in Amman, Jordan, to a Palestinian Christians family, is the Palestinian-American executive director of the Arab Film Festival and the former Western Regional director of the American-Arab Anti-Discrimination Committee (1996-2003).

The Palestinian-raised Shehadeh relocated to the United States for college in 1975. In 1987, he was the subject of investigation by the US Government as a suspected abettor of terrorists, one of the media-dubbed "Los Angeles Eight", but Shehadeh and the other seven individuals were cleared of charges in 2007.

Shehadeh holds a BA in Journalism and a Master's in Public Administration from California State University, Long Beach.

References

External links
  Michel Shehadeh, IMEU
 Arab Film Festival

Living people
American people of Palestinian descent
Year of birth missing (living people)